In enzymology, a cholestenol Δ-isomerase is an enzyme that catalyzes the chemical reaction

5alpha-cholest-7-en-3beta-ol  5alpha-cholest-8-en-3beta-ol

Hence, this enzyme has one substrate, 5alpha-cholest-7-en-3beta-ol, and one product, 5alpha-cholest-8-en-3beta-ol.

This enzyme belongs to the family of isomerases, specifically those intramolecular oxidoreductases transposing C=C bonds.  The systematic name of this enzyme class is Delta7-cholestenol Delta7-Delta8-isomerase. This enzyme participates in biosynthesis of steroids.

See also 

 Emopamil binding protein

References 

 

EC 5.3.3
Enzymes of unknown structure